Israel–Sri Lanka relations are official relations between Israel and Sri Lanka.

History
Sri Lankan President J.R. Jayewardene established diplomatic ties with Israel. Diplomatic ties were suspended under president Ranasingha Premadasa, but restored in 2000.

Israel was a source of weapons and training for the armed forces during the war against Liberation Tigers of Tamil Eelam and weapons sold to the country, including IAI Kfir Fighter Jet, the Super Dvora Mk III-class patrol boat, Saar 4 class missile boats and the Gabriel missile.

In February 2020, Israel offered Sri Lanka technology in agriculture, education, transportation and IT sectors which was welcomed by the newly elected president Gotabaya Rajapaksa.

In September 2021, the Sri Lankan government signed an agreement with Israel to upgrade Sri Lanka Air Forces Kfirs

Diplomatic Relations
Sri Lanka has an embassy in Tel Aviv. The Sri Lankan ambassador to Israel is Waruna Wilpatha

Foreign Workers 
In 2017, the governments of Israel, Sri Lanka, and Nepal signed a bi-lateral agreement to bring foreign nursing aides to Israel.  The agreement resulted from the difficulties in supervising the quality of nursing aides arriving in Israel and in preventing employment agencies from taking illegal payment from potential workers in their country of origin to enable them to enter Israel.  In order to identify the best ways to improve the system, a program brought 100 nursing aides, who participated in a special training program to prepare them for work in Israel.  An evaluation of the pilot found that participants and employers both reported high satisfaction with the training and the process, with no indications from that the nursing aides had paid any more money than the amount specified in the initial agreement.

See also
Foreign relations of Israel

References

 
Sri Lanka
Bilateral relations of Sri Lanka